Jonathan Podwil (born 1966) is an American painter and experimental filmmaker living and working in Brooklyn, New York.  He is known for paintings based on film and photography and often have oblique references to historical events.  In addition he has made short super8 films which are digitally manipulated and presented as looped animations.

Podwil earned his B.A. from the University of Pennsylvania later studied at the Pennsylvania Academy of the Fine Arts, in Philadelphia, Pennsylvania and the Malmö Konstskola Forum in Sweden. His exhibitions have been reviewed in Artforum, The New Yorker, the New York Sun, and the Austrian Publications Wiener Zeitung and Eikon.  Podwil has exhibited at galleries and nonprofit art spaces such as White Columns and Smack Mellon, Postmasters, and Plane Space in New York City,  Kunstlerhaus Bethanien in Berlin and IG Bildende Kunst  T19, and >RAUMSTATION in Vienna.

He is a recipient of a 2012 Pollock-Krasnser Foundation fellowship.

External links 

Personal site 

Plane Space website 

ARTFORUM review 

Wiener Zeitung review  

The New York Sun review  

Saatchi Gallery blog review  

Pollock-Krasner Foundation https://pkf.org

>RAUMSTATION contemporary art and media space Vienna, Austria. http://www.raumstation.space

1966 births
Living people
20th-century American painters
American male painters
21st-century American painters
21st-century American male artists
Postmodern artists
20th-century American male artists